The 2018 Lebanese Elite Cup is the 21st edition of this football tournament in Lebanon. The competition started on 28 July through to the final. This tournament includes the six best teams from the 2017–18 Lebanese Premier League season.

Group stage

Group A

Group B

Final stage

Semi finals

Final

Top scorers

Top scorers

References 

Lebanese Elite Cup seasons
Elite